The RAS-1 Getta was a flying boat produced in Romania during the 1920s.

Design and Development
The RAS-1 Getta was designed by engineer Radu Stoica. It was a sesquiplane with a seating capacity of three, able to reach a top speed of 160 km/h (99 mph). Following its successful maiden flight, on 15 August 1925, the Romanian Government ordered three more machines. The four flying boats were produced by STC, this model being the company's only product.

Operators
 
 Royal Romanian Naval Aviation

Specifications

References

Bibliography

External links
 Digital drawings

1920s Romanian military aircraft
Flying boats
High-wing aircraft
Aircraft first flown in 1924
World War II Romanian aircraft